Charles Nicolas Joseph Justin Favart (17 March 1749 in Paris – 1 or 2 February 1806) was a French playwright at the Comédie-Italienne for two decades. Favard was also an actor at the Comédie Française for fifteen years. Usually known as Nicolas Favart, formally Charles-Nicolas Favart or C.-N. Favart, he was simply Favart fils (Favart Jr) in his time.

Favart was the son of the dramatist, Charles Simon Favart, and was himself a playwright. He wrote a number of successful opéras comiques, such as Le Diable boiteux (1782) and Le Mariage singulier (1787). His son Antoine-Pierre-Charles Favart (1780–1867) was in the diplomatic service, and assisted in editing his grandfather's memoirs; he was a playwright and painter as well.

References

Sources 
 
 Gustave Vapereau, Dictionnaire universel des littératures, Paris, Hachette, 1876,

External links 
 Nicolas Favart at Cesar.org.uk

Artists from Paris
1749 births
1806 deaths
18th-century French dramatists and playwrights
18th-century French male actors
French male stage actors